Mmm or MMM may refer to:

Organizations 
3M (NYSE: MMM), a US company
MMM (Ponzi scheme), a Russian company 1989-1994
MMM Global, a relaunch of the MMM Ponzi scheme in 2011
Everybody's Hungary Movement (MMM), a political movement established in 2018
Maison Margiela, a French luxury fashion house formerly known as Maison Martin Margiela (MMM)
Mauritian Militant Movement, a political party
Messner Mountain Museum
Morgan-McClure Motorsports, a defunct NASCAR team
Mysteria Mystica Maxima (M∴M∴M∴), an occult organization

Media
MuchMoreMusic, a Canadian cable television channel
McKenna Mendelson Mainline, a Canadian blues quartet
The Mythical Man-Month (MM-M), a project management book

Radio
Triple M (MMM), radio network in Australia
Triple M Sydney (2MMM; aka MMM), radio station in Sydney, Australia; the origin of the radio network
WMMM, callsign MMM in region W
WMMM-FM ("105-5 Triple M"), a radio station in Madison, Wisconsin, USA
WMMM-AM, former callsign for WSHU (AM), a radio station in Westport, Connecticut, USA
KMMM, callsign MMM in region K
KMMM-AM, an AM radio station in Pratt, Kansas, USA
KMMM-FM, former callsign for KHTT, an FM radio station in Tulsa, Oklahoma, USA

Events 
Million Marijuana March, an annual rally

Science 
Masticatory muscle myositis; a canine disease of the jaw
Mesoscale and microscale meteorology, weather systems smaller than synoptic scale
Myelofibrosis with myeloid metaplasia, a disease of bone marrow

Entertainment

Music
 Mamamoo (MMM), a Korean pop group
 Mecki Mark Men, a Swedish progressive rock group
 Metal Machine Music, an album by Lou Reed
 MMM (Money Making Mitch), an album by Puff Daddy
 "MMM", a 2019 single by Peakboy
 "MMM", a 2022 single by Minelli

Television
 MMM, the production code for the 1972 Doctor Who serial The Curse of Peladon

Other uses
The number 3000, in Roman numerals
Marketing mix modeling, a method of statistical analysis
Order of Military Merit (Canada), a Canadian military honour for merit
Metropolitan Methodist Mission, a large church of the Rocky River Conference of the Methodist Episcopal Church
Middlemount Airport, Queensland, Australia, IATA code MMM
Military Merit Medal (South Africa)
Mixed-member majoritarian representation

See also

 3M (disambiguation)
 M3 (disambiguation)
 Triple M (disambiguation)
Mmmh (disambiguation)